Mesciniadia otoptila is a species of snout moth in the genus Mesciniadia described by Alfred Jefferis Turner in 1913. It is found in Australia.

References

Moths described in 1913
Phycitini